Mandy Kornet (born 3 February 1985) is a Dutch former cricketer who played as a right-arm medium bowler. She appeared in one Test match, 15 One Day Internationals and two Twenty20 Internationals for the Netherlands between 2001 and 2009. She is the older sister of Mariska Kornet, who has also represented the Netherlands at cricket.

Kornet made her One Day International (ODI) debut aged 16, against England in August 2001. At the time of her debut, only Cheraldine Oudolf had debuted at a younger age for the Netherlands. Against Japan at the 2003 IWCC Trophy, Kornet took what were to be the best figures of her ODI career, 3/10 from 10 overs. However, after that tournament, she did not again appear for the Netherlands until 2007, when she played three ODIs and a single Test against the touring South Africans. The Test match was the first and only match played by the Netherlands at that level.

In July 2008, Kornet made her Twenty20 International debut, taking 1/20 against the West Indies. The following year, at the 2009 European Championship, the regular Dutch captain, Helmien Rambaldo, was unable to play, and Kornet was appointed captain in her place. The tournament had both 50-over and 20-over components, and the Netherlands won its matches against Scotland in both of those formats. However, the team did not win either of its games against Ireland, leaving Kornet without a win as captain in ODIs or T20Is. Kornet missed the 2010 season after falling pregnant, and did not return to the team after giving birth, meaning her two matches as captain were her last at international level.

References

External links
 

1985 births
Living people
Sportspeople from Rotterdam
Dutch women cricketers
Netherlands women Test cricketers
Netherlands women One Day International cricketers
Netherlands women Twenty20 International cricketers
Dutch women cricket captains
20th-century Dutch women
21st-century Dutch women